The Grand Concourse Apartments is a historic site in Miami Shores, Florida built in 1926. It is located at 421 Grand Concourse. On December 2, 1985, it was added to the U.S. National Register of Historic Places.  It was designed by Robert L. Weed.

References and external links

 Dade County listings at National Register of Historic Places
 Dade County listings at Florida's Office of Cultural and Historical Programs

National Register of Historic Places in Miami-Dade County, Florida
Residential buildings on the National Register of Historic Places in Florida
Apartment buildings in Florida
Residential buildings completed in 1926
Buildings and structures in Miami-Dade County, Florida
1926 establishments in Florida